Ragana may refer to:

Ragana (moth), a genus of moths
Ragana, Latvia, a village in Krimulda Municipality, Latvia
, a mythical being in Latvian mythology and Lithuanian mythology, a witch

People with the surname
Šatrijos Ragana (1877–1930), Lithuanian writer